The 2004 Campeonato Brasileiro Série A was the 48th edition of the Campeonato Brasileiro Série A. The competition was won by Santos, coached by Vanderlei Luxemburgo.
Runners-up were Atlético Paranaense, which led the competition for 11 weeks and lost the title in the penultimate round. The other teams qualified for the Copa Libertadores were from the state of São Paulo, São Paulo and Palmeiras.
The highest goal scorer was Washington (Atlético Paranaense), who scored 34 goals and broke the tournament's record. Beginning two seasons were four teams would be relegated and only two promoted so the tournament would have 20 teams by 2006, the four teams relegated to the second division were Criciúma, Guarani, Vitória and  Grêmio.

Format 
For the second consecutive season, the tournament will be played in a double round-robin system. The team with most points at the end of the season will be declared champion. The bottom four teams will be relegated and will play in the Campeonato Brasileiro Série B in the 2005 season.

International qualification 
The Série A will serve as a qualifier to CONMEBOL's 2005 Copa Libertadores. The top-three teams in the standings will qualify to the Second Stage of the competition, while the fourth place in the standings will qualify to the First Stage.

Teams

Stadiums and locations

Personnel and kits

Standings

Positions by round

Top scorers

References

Campeonato Brasileiro Série A seasons
1